Zeynep Sude Demirel (born March 25, 1996) is a Turkish volleyball player. She plays for Türk Hava Yolları Spor Kulübü.

Career
On 22 April 2021, she signed a 1-year contract with the Galatasaray Women's Volleyball Team.

References

External links
Player profile at Volleybox.net

2000 births
Sportspeople from İzmit
Living people
Turkish women's volleyball players
Galatasaray S.K. (women's volleyball) players
Yeşilyurt volleyballers
21st-century Turkish sportswomen